Albert Coates (1896–1989) was the founder and long-time director of the Institute of Government at the University of North Carolina.

Coates earned a bachelor's degree from the University of North Carolina in 1918 and an LLB from Harvard University in 1923. Upon graduation, Coates joined the faculty of the University of North Carolina School of Law and taught there until 1969. In 1932, Coates founded the Institute of Government at the University of North Carolina. He served as its director until 1962.

References

External links 
 Inventory of the Albert Coates Papers, 1916-1980s, in the Southern Historical Collection, UNC-Chapel Hill.

North Carolina lawyers
1896 births
1989 deaths
Harvard Law School alumni
University of North Carolina at Chapel Hill alumni
University of North Carolina at Chapel Hill faculty
20th-century American lawyers